Ella is most often used as a feminine given name, but also occurs as a surname, especially in Australia. In Greek mythology, Ella (Greek: Ἕλλα) was the daughter of Athamas and Nephele. The name may be a cognate with Hellas (Greek: Ἑλλάς), the Greek name for Greece, which said to have been originally the name of the region round Dodona.

Another source indicates the name is a Norman version of the Germanic short name Alia, which was short for a variety of German names with the element ali-, meaning "other." It is also a common short name for names starting with El-, such as Eleanor, Elizabeth, Elle, Ellen, Elaine, Ellie, or Eloise.

The Hebrew word Ella (אלה) has two meanings:

 A tree indigenous to the Middle East, of the pistachio family (Pistacia terebinthus). As written in Isaiah 6-13: "And though a tenth remains in the land, it will again be laid waste. But as the terebinth and oak leave stumps when they are cut down, so the holy seed will be the stump in the land." 
 Ella means "goddess" in modern Hebrew. 

Ella became popular again during the Victorian era in English-speaking countries, and has again been popular in the late 20th and early 21st centuries for baby girls born in Anglophone countries.
The name Ella is very popular in County Kerry, Ireland as well as in Israel.

People with the given name 
 Ella Anderson (born 2005), American child actress
 Ella Hoag Brockway Avann (1853–1899), American educator, and writer
 Ella Baker (1903–1986), African American civil rights and human rights activist
 Ella Maria Ballou (1852-1937), American stenographer, reporter, essayist, and educator
 Ella Jay Basco, American actress
 Ella A. Bigelow  (1849–1917), American author and clubwoman
 Ella Bully-Cummings (born 1958), first female police chief of Detroit
 Ella Chen (born 1981), member of the Taiwanese girl group S.H.E.
 Ella Maria Dietz Clymer (1847-1920), American actress and poet
 Ella Mcmonagle (born 2007)
 Ella Corfield (nee Caird), British pharmacist 
 Ella D. Crawford (1852-1932), American temperance movement organizer
 Ella Cruz (born 1996), Filipina actress, product endorser, host, commercial & promotional model, and dancer
 Ella Cara Deloria (1888–1971), educator, anthropologist, ethnographer, linguist, and novelist
 Ella Hepworth Dixon (1857–1932), English writer, novelist, and editor
 Ella Loraine Dorsey (1853–1935), American author, journalist, and translator
 Ella Hamilton Durley (1852–1922), American educator, newspaper editor, and journalist
 Ella Emhoff (born 1999), American model, artist, designer, and U.S. Second Daughter
 Ella Endlich (born 1984), German singer 
 Ella Eronen (1900-1987), Finnish actress
 Ella Eyre (born 1994), English singer
 Ella Fitzgerald (1917–1996), American jazz singer
 Ella M. George (1850-1938), American teacher, lecturer, social reformer
 Ella German (born 1937), friend of Lee Harvey Oswald
 Ella T. Grasso (1919–1981), American politician and first woman elected governor of Connecticut
 Ella Havelka (born 1989), ballet dancer and first Indigenous person to join the Australian Ballet
 Ella Gifft, (1882–1964), American businesswoman and suffragist
 Ella Guru (born 1966), American painter and musician
 Ella Henderson (born 1996), British singer
 Ella Hunt (born 1998), British actress
 Ella Jenkins (born 1924), American folk singer
 Ella Junnila (born 1998), Finnish high jumper
 Ella Eaton Kellogg (1853–1920), American philanthropist and pioneer in dietetics
 Ella B. Kendrick (1849–1928), American temperance activist
 Ella Koon (born 1979), Hong Kong singer
 Ella Logan (1913–1969), Scottish actress and singer
 Ella Mai (born 1994), British singer
 Ella Maillart (1903–1997), Swiss adventurer, travel writer, photographer, and sportswoman
 Ella M. S. Marble (1850-1929), American journalist, educator, activist, and physician
 Ella Morgan (1876–1958), American school librarian
 Ella Mae Morse (1924–1999), popular American singer from the 1940s
 Ella Pamfilova (born 1953), Russian politician
 Ella Purnell (born 1996), English actress
 Ella Raines (1920–1988), American actress 
 Ella Giles Ruddy (1851–1917), American author, editor 	
 Ella Smith (born 1983), English actress 
 Ella G. Smith (born 2005), American artist, photographer, and author
 Ella Shields (1879–1952), British music hall singer and male impersonator
 Ella Yelich-O'Connor (born 1996), Kiwi musician, known by her stage name “Lorde”
 Ella Young (1867–1956), Irish poet and Celtic mythologist
 Ella Wheeler Wilcox (1850-1919), American poet and author
 Ella B. Ensor Wilson (1838-1913), American social reformer and writer

People with the surname
 Gary Ella (born 1960), Australian former rugby union footballer
 Glen Ella (born 1959), Australian former rugby union footballer
 Krishna Ella (born 1969), Indian scientist and entrepreneur
 Mark Ella (born 1959), Australian former rugby union footballer
 Norman Ella (1910–1987), Australian rowing coxswain
 Steve Ella (born 1960), Australian former rugby league footballer

Fictional characters 
 Ella, the heroine from Cinderella (2015)
Ella, the main character from Ella Enchanted
 Ella, a character from Total Drama: Pahkitew Island
 Ella Lopez, a character from Lucifer
 Elinor "Ella" Love, a character in Motown Magic
 Ella, a character in PAW Patrol
 Ella Montgomery, a character from Pretty Little Liars

See also 

 Matronymic

Notes

English feminine given names